This is a list of notable people who are from Kingston, Jamaica, or have spent a large part or formative part of their career in that city.

Notable people
 Yellowman, reggae and dancehall artist
 Bob Andy, reggae vocalist 
 Cory Burke, soccer player 
 Buju Banton, reggae singer
 John Barnes, English footballer
 Aston "Family Man" Barrett, bassist
 Beenie Man, real name Moses Davis, dancehall artist, husband of Michelle "D'Angel" Downer
 Louise Bennett-Coverley, folk singer, poet, comedian
 Atari Bigby, former NFL player
 Ken Boothe, artist
 Bounty Killer, dancehall artist
 Cindy Breakspeare, Miss World 1976
 Dennis Brown, reggae singer
 Errol Brown, singer 
 Canibus, rapper
 Alberto Campbell-Staines, Australian athlete with an intellectual disability
 Frederic G. Cassidy, linguist and lexicographer
 Patrick Chung, NFL football player for the New England Patriots
 Kofi Cockburn, Basketball player for the Illinois Fighting Illini
 Frederic Hymen Cowen, British composer
 Carole Crawford, Miss World 1963
 Theodore Curphey, coroner
 Omar Daley, footballer
 Robert Charles Dallas, lawyer, historian and friend of Lord Byron
 Chili Davis, former Major League Baseball player
 Desmond Dekker, singer and songwriter
 Sandy Denton, "Pepa" of hip hop group Salt-N-Pepa
 Coxsone Dodd, reggae music producer
 Sly Dunbar, reggae musician, dub music producer
 Leon Edwards, Jamaican-born English mixed martial artist, current UFC Welterweight Champion
 Eek-A-Mouse, reggae singer
 Elephant Man, dancehall artist
 Patrick Ewing, former NBA basketball player and coach
 Heather Foster, Jamaica-born American professional bodybuilder
 Shelly-Ann Fraser, Olympic gold medalist
 Ricardo Fuller, footballer for Hanley Town
 Ricardo Gardner, former footballer
 Amy Jacques Garvey, journalist, publisher, second wife of Marcus Garvey
 Chris Gayle, cricketer
 Andrew Gourlay, conductor
 Howard Grant, boxer
 Richard Hall, professional boxer
 Lisa Hanna, Miss World 1993, politician
 Bob Hazell, former footballer
 Paul Hewitt, U.S. basketball coach
 John Holt, reggae singer and songwriter 
 Kamara James, Olympic fencer
 Jah’Mila, reggae musician
 Jermaine Johnson, footballer for Tivoli Gardens
 Sandra Levy, field hockey player
 Jean Lowrie-Chin, communications consultant, seniors advocate, author and newspaper columnist
 Macka Diamond, real name Charmaine Munroe, dancehall artist
 Michael Manley, Jamaican politician and prime minister
 Bob Marley, musician and singer-songwriter
 Damian Marley, reggae artiste and youngest son of Bob Marley
 Ziggy Marley, reggae artiste and son of Bob Marley
 Justin Masterson, Major League Baseball pitcher for the Cleveland Indians
 Mavado, dancehall artist
 Mike McCallum, three division world champion professional boxer
 Marcus Milner, footballer
 Sean Paul, dancehall and reggae artist
 Yendi Phillips, Miss Universe 2010 1st runner-up
 Donald Quarrie, sprinter
 Shabba Ranks, dancehall artist
 Junior Reid, reggae singer
 Hazelle P. Rogers, politician 
 U-Roy, pioneer of toasting
 Ricky Sappleton, footballer for Cheshunt
 Mary Seacole, medical pioneer
 Shaggy, reggae singer
 Winsome Sears, politician 
 Robbie Shakespeare, reggae musician, dub music producer 
 Nadine Spencer, businesswoman
 Raheem Sterling, footballer for Manchester City
 Super Cat, dancehall artist
 Ryan Thompson, footballer for Austin Bold
 Alfred Valentine, cricketer
 Vybz Kartel, dancehall singer
 Courtney Walsh, cricketer
 Devon White, former Major League Baseball player
 Willard White, opera singer
 Jheanelle Wilkins, politician 
 Hyman Wright, reggae record producer

References

Kingston